is the fourth single from Ayaka, released on September 27, 2006.

Information
"Mikazuki" was originally supposed to be Ayaka's first single but was pushed back. A music video was produced before Ayaka's first single, "I Believe", was even released. The song was used as a commercial song for a chain of Japanese record stores and later used for a drama known as @Human. When the single was released, it became Ayaka's first number-one single.

Chart performance
In April 2009, when the Recording Industry Association of Japan created the RIAJ Digital Track Chart "Mikazuki" debuted at No. 40. The song charted below the Top 40s until the release of her compilation album Ayaka's History 2006–2009 on September 23, 2009, when it peaked at No. 18. On the Billboard Japan Hot 100, the song debuted at No. 60.  It was certified "platinum" and a million seller by the RIAJ.

Track listing

Charts

Certifications

Charice version

In 2010, Filipino pop singer Charice, now known as Jake Zyrus, recorded an English version of the song entitled "Crescent Moon" as part of the Japanese edition of his self-titled international debut album, Charice. It was released as a promotional single in Japan on June 23, 2010 via iTunes, and is the third overall single from Charice.

References

2006 singles
Ayaka songs
Oricon Weekly number-one singles
2010 singles
Jake Zyrus songs
2006 songs
143 Records singles
Warner Music Japan singles
Songs written by Ayaka